The Gulf States Conference (GSC) was an intercollegiate athletic football conference that existed from 1948 to 1971. The league had members in Alabama, Louisiana, and Mississippi. Many of the league's members from Louisiana joined after the Louisiana Intercollegiate Conference disbanded after the 1947 season.

Member schools

Final members

Notes

Other members

Notes

Football champions

1948 – Mississippi Southern
1949 – Louisiana Tech
1950 – Mississippi Southern
1951 – Mississippi Southern
1952 – Louisiana Tech, and Southwestern Louisiana
1953 – Louisiana Tech, Northwestern State, and Southeastern Louisiana
1954 – 
1955 – Louisiana Tech
1956 – 
1957 – Louisiana Tech, and 
1958 – Louisiana Tech and 
1959 – Louisiana Tech

1960 – Louisiana Tech and 
1961 –  and 
1962 – 
1963 – 
1964 – Louisiana Tech
1965 –  and 
1966 – 
1967 – 
1968 – Southwestern Louisiana
1969 – Louisiana Tech
1970 – Southwestern Louisiana

Membership timeline

References

 
Sports organizations established in 1948
Organizations disestablished in 1971